The Kennebec River (Abenaki: Kinəpékʷihtəkʷ) is a  river within the U.S. state of Maine. It rises in Moosehead Lake in west-central Maine. The East and West Outlets join at Indian Pond and the river flows southward. Harris Station Dam, the largest hydroelectric dam in the state, was constructed near that confluence. The river is joined at The Forks by its tributary the Dead River, also called the West Branch.

It continues south past the cities of Madison, Skowhegan, Waterville, and the state capital Augusta. At Richmond, it flows into Merrymeeting Bay, a  freshwater tidal bay into which also flow the Androscoggin River and five smaller rivers.

The Kennebec runs past the shipbuilding center of Bath, and has its mouth at the Gulf of Maine in the Atlantic Ocean. The Southern Kennebec flows below the fall line and does not have rapids. As a consequence, ocean tides and saltwater fish species, such as the endangered Atlantic Sturgeon, can go upriver affecting the ecology as far north as Waterville, a small city located more than 35 miles inland. Tributaries of the Kennebec include the Carrabassett River, Sandy River, and Sebasticook River.

Segments of the East Coast Greenway run along the Kennebec.

Etymology

The name "Kennebec" comes from the Eastern Abenaki /kínipekʷ/, meaning "large body of still water, large bay".

History

Discovery by Europeans

In 1605, French explorer Samuel de Champlain navigated the coast of what is now Maine, charting the land and rivers of what was then called New France, L'Acadie, including the Kennebec as far upriver as present-day Bath, as well as the St. Croix, and Penobscot rivers. In the 1600s the Abenaki village of Norridgewock was located along the Kennebec.

Shipbuilding
The English founded the Popham Colony along the Kennebec in 1607. An English trading post, Cushnoc, was established on the Kennebec in 1628.

Bath and other cities along the Kennebec were developed, and artisans founded shipyards that produced hundreds of wooden and steel vessels. Bath became known as the "City of Ships". The , one of the largest wooden schooners ever built, was constructed here.

Following the War of 1812 between the United States and Great Britain, the US enjoyed a lengthy period of expansion of international trade, which increased the demand for shipbuilding and stimulated the growth of maritime fleets. Many of those ships were built in Bath. In 1854, at the peak of this boom period, at least nineteen major firms were building ships in Bath. Changes in the industry since the mid-20th century have resulted in the decline in US shipbuilding, as jobs moved offshore. The sole remaining shipyard in Bath is the Bath Iron Works, owned by General Dynamics; this is one of the few yards still building warships for the United States Navy. The USCGC Kennebec was named after this river.

Navigation
With waterways the most accessible travel routes, the Kennebec River served as an early trade corridor to interior Maine from the Atlantic coast. Ocean ships could navigate upstream as far as Augusta. The cities of Bath, Gardiner, Hallowell and Augusta, and the towns of Woolwich, Richmond and Randolph, all developed along this transportation corridor.

Upstream of Augusta, the timber industry used the river for log driving, to transport wooden logs and pulpwood from interior forests to sawmills and paper mills built along the river to use its water power. The city of Waterville and the towns of Winslow, Skowhegan, Norridgewock, Madison, Anson, and Bingham were all related to the lumber trade. The Maine Central Railroad and U.S. Route 201 were later constructed to make use of the flatlands along the river through these towns and cities.

Father Rale's War 
England's 1710 conquest of Acadia brought mainland Nova Scotia under English control, but New France still claimed present-day New Brunswick and present-day Maine east of the Kennebec River.  (The Kennebec River was also a border for the indigenous Native Americans and First Nations.) To secure its claim, New France established Catholic missions in the three largest native villages in the region: one on the Kennebec River (Norridgewock); one further north on the Penobscot River (Penobscot), and one on the Saint John River (Medoctec).

Abenaki warriors along the Kennebec resisted English encroachment by armed confrontations, in what American historians sometimes refer to as Father Rale's War (1722–1725). A Yankee militia raid on the Abenaki Indian mission village at Norridgewock in August 1724 crippled the Abenaki resistance, as they killed as many as 40 inhabitants, including women and children. They also killed and scalped Fr. Sebastien Rasle, the 67-year old Jesuit priest, and scalped 26 of the dead Abenaki. Having plundered and torched the tribal village, the Yankee raiders destroyed the surrounding corn fields; they were paid bounties for the scalps. Some Abenaki survivors returned to the Upper Kennebec, but others took refuge with Penobscot allies or in Abenaki mission villages in French Canada.

Revolutionary War
Some 1,110 American Revolutionary War soldiers followed the route of the Kennebec during Benedict Arnold's expedition to Quebec in 1775.

War of 1812
During the War of 1812, United States and British Canadian forces fought at the Battle of Hampden in Maine.

Ice industry
In 1814, Frederic Tudor began to establish markets in the West Indies and the southern United States for ice. In 1826, Rufus Page built the first large ice house near Gardiner, in order to supply Tudor. The ice was harvested during the winter from the river by farmers and others who were otherwise relatively inactive. They cut it by hand, floated the huge chunks to an ice house on the bank, and stored it until spring. Then, packed in sawdust, the ice was loaded aboard ships and sent to the South.

Flood of 1987
At the flood's peak, the flow topped out at an estimated . Signs of the flood can still be found in the towns and cities that line the river.

Whitewater rafting 
In 1976 Suzanne and Wayne Hockmeyer, of Kennebec Whitewater Expeditions (now Northern Outdoors), pioneered whitewater rafting through the Kennebec gorge just below Harris Station Dam.

In the early 21st century, Northern Outdoors and 22 other rafting companies in The Forks conduct rafting on the river daily from May through October. Four times per rafting season, Brookfield Power tests their generating turbines by releasing the maximum amount of water possible from Harris Station Dam. At 8000 cubic feet per second, these Kennebec River Turbine Tests are the biggest whitewater releases in Maine.

Natural resources
Prior to the industrial era, the river contained many anadromous fish, in particular the Atlantic salmon. The exploiting of hydroelectric power in the region reduced the runs of such fish. The removal of dams on the river has been a controversial local issue in recent years. The removal of the Edwards Dam in 1999 has led to increased anadromous activity on the river.

Dams

Hydroelectricity
The following is a list of hydroelectric power stations on the Kennebec River

Removal of Edwards Dam 
The Kennebec River before the construction of Edwards Dam was extremely important as a spawning ground for Atlantic fish. In 1837, the Edwards Dam was built across the Kennebec River, just shy of the limit of tidal influence.

In 1999, the dam was removed, after the Federal Energy Regulatory Commission (FERC) determined that the ecological benefits of removing it outweighed the value of the electricity it produced, and refused the renewal of the dam license.

Despite several negative visual and environmental factors at first, the ecosystem is healing itself. Initially after the removal of the dam, barren riverbanks and muddy water were evident along the lower  of the Kennebec. Introduced smallmouth bass will suffer from the re-introduced striped bass, which tend to feed on young smallmouth bass. An increase in raptor populations, such as ospreys, bald eagles, herons, cormorants, and kingfishers, is evident.

Human activities also benefited from the dam removal. The exposure of rapids and the return of native fish species allows many recreational activities, including canoeing, kayaking, whitewater rafting, and fishing.

Statistics
The United States government maintains three river flow gauges on the Kennebec river. Two additional river stage gauges (no flow data) are in Augusta and Gardiner; both of these gauge heights are affected by ocean tides.

Before the river was dammed, it was navigable as far as Augusta.

See also
List of rivers of Maine

References

External links

MaineRivers.org Kennebec River profile
Real-time flow or stage data for The Forks, Bingham, North Sidney, Augusta, and Gardiner gages.
Kennebec-Chaudiere Kennebec-Chaudiere International Corridor

 
Rivers of Kennebec County, Maine
Rivers of Piscataquis County, Maine
Rivers of Sagadahoc County, Maine
Rivers of Somerset County, Maine
Augusta, Maine
Ice trade
North Maine Woods
Rivers of Maine